Rogi  is a village in the administrative district of Gmina Niemodlin, within Opole County, Opole Voivodeship, in south-western Poland.

The village has an approximate population of 150.

References 

Villages in Opole County